Schraden is a municipality in the Elbe-Elster district, in Brandenburg, Germany.

History
From 1816 to 1944, Schraden was part of the Prussian Province of Saxony.

From 1952 to 1990, Schraden was part of the Bezirk Cottbus of East Germany.

Demography

References

Localities in Elbe-Elster